Tashkent State Pedagogic University named after Nizami is one of the largest higher educational institutions in Uzbekistan. Former name in Soviet times: Tashkent State Pedagogical Institute.

The history of the creation of the university 
The Tashkent State Pedagogical Institute named after Nizami was established on the basis of the Faculty of Pedagogy of the Central Asian State University in accordance with the order of the Commissariat for Public Education of the Republic of Uzbekistan No. 1364 dated September 14, 1935.

In 1961, the Tashkent Evening Pedagogical Institute named after V. G. Belinsky was attached to the institute.

By the Decree of the Cabinet of Ministers of the Republic of Uzbekistan No. 77 dated February 2, 1998, the Tashkent State Pedagogical Institute was given the status of a university.

In total, since its inception, the university has trained more than 200 thousand scientific and pedagogical personnel.

General information 
The total area of the university is 77074.25 sq. m., in particular, the educational area is 24694 m2. Currently, the university has 8 faculties (Physics and Mathematics, Natural Sciences, Pedagogy, Psychology and Defectology, Foreign Languages, History, Vocational Education, Primary Education and Physical Education, and Pre-Conscription Military Education) and 52 departments. Specialists are being trained in 31 bachelor's and 29 master's specialties.

The teaching staff of the university includes 55 doctors of sciences, professors, more than 265 candidates of sciences, and associate professors. More than 700 teachers teach undergraduate and graduate students the basics of science. The university is located in 8 academic buildings.

University museums 
Currently, the university has a museum complex, consisting of a museum of the history of the university, archaeological and educational zoological museums.

References

Educational institutions established in 1935